Loof or Lööf (Swedish variant) is a Germanic surname that may refer to:

Anders Lööf (born 1961), Swedish male curler
Annie Lööf (born 1983), Swedish politician
Annika Lööf (born 1966), Swedish female curler
Augustine Loof (born 1996), Dutch football player
Dajana Lööf (born 1983), Swedish singer, songwriter and TV-host
Ernst Loof (1907–1956), German automotive engineer and racing driver
Fredrik Lööf (born 1969), Swedish sailor 
Jan Lööf (born 1940), Swedish illustrator, author, comic creator, and jazz musician
Leo Lööf (born 2002), Swedish ice hockey player
Romain De Loof (born 1941), Belgian cyclist
Ylva Lööf (born 1958), Swedish actress
A kosher variant of Spam